Roding is a town in the district of Cham, in Bavaria, Germany, near the Czech border.

First mayors since 1945

Sons and daughters of the town

 Louis Mary Fink OSB (1834-1904), Benedictine and Bishop of the Archbishopric of Kansas City
 Heimrad Prem (1934-1978), painter, member of the artist group SPUR (1958-1965)

Personalities who lived / worked on the ground

 Hermann Höcherl (1912-1989), CSU politician, former Federal Minister of the Interior

References

Cham (district)